The South African Youth Congress (SAYCO) was a pro-African National Congress youth organization, active in the struggle against Apartheid. The motto of SAYCO was "Victory is Certain - Freedom or Death". In 1990 SAYCO merged with the ANC Youth League.

Anti-Apartheid organisations
Defunct civic and political organisations in South Africa
Politics of South Africa
Political organisations based in South Africa